Aqua Something You Know Whatever (or ASYKW) is the alternative title given to the ninth season of the animated television series Aqua Teen Hunger Force. The ninth season originally aired in the United States on Adult Swim. This season had a total of ten episodes, premiering with "Big Bro" on June 24, 2012 and ending with "Totem Pole" on August 26, 2012. The show is about the surreal adventures and antics of three anthropomorphic fast food items: Master Shake, Frylock, and Meatwad, who live together as roommates and frequently interact with their human next-door neighbor, Carl Brutananadilewski in a suburban neighborhood Seattle, New Jersey, a fictional location which is completely identical to their other previous homes seen in past seasons. In May 2015, this season became available on Hulu Plus, and in May 2020, it became available on HBO Max.

Episodes in this season were written and directed by Dave Willis and Matt Maiellaro. Almost every episode in this season features a special guest appearance, which continues a practice used in past seasons. This season has been released in various forms of home media, including on demand streaming.

Production
Every episode in this season was written and directed by series creators Dave Willis and Matt Maiellaro, who have both written and directed every episode of the series. All episodes originally aired in the United States on Cartoon Network's late night programming block, Adult Swim. The theme music for this season was written and performed by Mariachi El Bronx and Schoolly D.

Cast

In season nine the main cast consisted of Dana Snyder who provided the voice of Master Shake, Carey Means who provided the voice of Frylock, and series co-creator Dave Willis who provided the voice of both Meatwad and Carl Brutananadilewski; and recurring character Ignignokt. Recurring cast member George Lowe returned for a prominent role in "Rocket Horse & Jet Chicken", where he voiced Jet Chicken.

Season nine also features several guest appearances. Insult comic Lisa Lampanelli voiced Carl's girlfriend Darlene in "Big Bro". Mastodon band members Brann Dailor, Brent Hinds, and Troy Sanders all voiced three rock devils Uno, Yahtzee, and Boggle, while Queens of the Stone Age's Josh Homme provided a guest voice of a giant octopus in "Shirt Herpes". Steve Schirripa provided the voice of Terry's partner (whose name turns out to be Dante) in "Bookie". Brett Gelman voiced Rocket Horse in "Rocket Horse & Jet Chicken". Comedian Kyle Kinane voiced a doctor in "Rocket Horse & Jet Chicken" and returned to voice Dr. Balthazar in "Buddy Nugget". Williams Street executive producer Walter Newman voiced himself in "Rocket Horse & Jet Chicken". Kurt Metzger has an uncredited role as a Flavor Flav impersonator in "Buddy Nugget". In "Zucotti Manicotti", Michael Jai White had an uncredited role as Zucotti Manicotti, and Crimson Tightwad was voiced by celebrity chef Kevin Gillespie, while The Boondocks veteran Carl Jones provided the voice of the real Zucotti. German metal band Wolfchant guest-starred as the infamous rock band Totem Pole in the season finale of the same name.

Episodes

Home release

The entire ninth season was released in HD and SD on iTunes, the Xbox Live Marketplace, and Amazon Video.

See also
 Alternative titles for Aqua Teen Hunger Force
 List of Aqua Teen Hunger Force episodes
 Aqua Teen Hunger Force

References

External links

 
 Aqua Teen Hunger Force at Adult Swim
 Aqua Teen Hunger Force season 9 at the Internet Movie Database

2012 American television seasons
Aqua Teen Hunger Force seasons